Lopresti is an Italian surname, also written LoPresti or Lo Presti. Notable people with the surname include:

Aaron Lopresti (born 1964), an American comic book artist
Charles LoPresti (born 1957), an American race horse trainer
Danielle LoPresti (born 1969), American musician
Matthew LoPresti, an American academic and politician
Mike Lopresti (born 1953), an American sportswriter
Jack Lopresti (born 1969), a British politician
Jaime Lopresti (born 1974), a Chilean footballer
Anna Banti (1895–1985), an Italian writer, art historian, critic, and translator, born Lucia Lopresti
Pete LoPresti (born 1954), an American ice hockey player, son of Sam
Peter Essex-Lopresti (1916–1951), a British orthopaedic surgeon
Rodrigo Lopresti (born 1976), an American actor, director, and musician
Rocco Lo Presti (1937–2009), an Italian mob boss of the Lo Presti 'ndrina
Roy LoPresti (1929–2002), an American aeronautical engineer
Sam LoPresti (1917–1984), an American ice hockey player, father of Pete
Mike Lopresti (born 1981), Internet personality

Italian-language surnames